Oleh Kramarenko (born 17 September 1970) is a Ukrainian sprinter who specialized in the 100 metres.

At the 1994 European Championships in Helsinki he finished fourth in the 100 m race and won a silver medal in 4 x 100 metres relay.

References
sports-reference

1970 births
Living people
Soviet male sprinters
Ukrainian male sprinters
World Athletics Championships athletes for the Soviet Union
Athletes (track and field) at the 1996 Summer Olympics
Olympic athletes of Ukraine
European Athletics Championships medalists